Episcopius is a surname. Notable people with the surname include:

Ludovicus Episcopius ( 1520–1595), Dutch-Flemish composer from the Franco-Flemish school 
Simon Episcopius (1583–1643), Dutch theologian